Tomás Belmonte (born 27 May 1998) is an Argentine professional footballer who plays as a midfielder for Lanús.

Career

Club
Belmonte's career got underway with Lanús, his local team. Manager Ezequiel Carboni promoted Belmonte into the club's senior squad midway through the 2017–18 Argentine Primera División campaign, awarding him his professional debut during a league encounter with Patronato on 27 January 2018; having selected him as an unused substitute for fixtures with Huracán and Defensa y Justicia in the months prior. He scored his first senior goal in Lanús' 2018–19 opener, netting against Defensa y Justicia on 12 August in a 2–2 draw.

International
Belmonte represented Argentina at U20 level, being selected for 2017 South American U-20 Championship in Ecuador and the subsequent 2017 FIFA U-20 World Cup in South Korea. He failed to feature in South Korea, but did play in four fixtures for his nation in Ecuador as they finished fourth.

Career statistics
.

Honours
Argentina U23
Pre-Olympic Tournament: 2020

References

External links

1998 births
Living people
Sportspeople from Lanús
Argentine footballers
Argentina youth international footballers
Argentina under-20 international footballers
Association football midfielders
Olympic footballers of Argentina
Footballers at the 2020 Summer Olympics
Argentine Primera División players
Club Atlético Lanús footballers